"Juliet" is a song written by John Hall and Larry Hoppen, and recorded by American country music group The Oak Ridge Boys.  It was released in March 1986 as the first single from the album Seasons.  The song reached number 16 on the Billboard Hot Country Singles & Tracks chart.

Music video
The music video features a Mardi Gras theme and stars actress Robin Christopher.

Chart performance

References

1986 singles
1986 songs
The Oak Ridge Boys songs
Songs written by John Hall (New York politician)
Song recordings produced by Ron Chancey
MCA Records singles